"Watercolour" is the first single from the third album Immersion by Australian drum and bass band Pendulum. This song has been remixed by dubstep artist Emalkay and by progressive house artist deadmau5. The video was shot on 16 March 2010 at a studio in East London featuring around 70 fans as extras. A behind-the-scenes video was released on the official Pendulum website. The music video was released as a Myspace exclusive on 31 March.

"Watercolour" debuted at number four on the UK Singles Chart, making it the band's highest-charting single in the United Kingdom. The song also featured on F1 2010 and Need for Speed: Hot Pursuit. The song was also used in a promo during the 2011 A-League Grand Final. It featured in the 2011 series of the BBC programme Traffic Cops. Pendulum performed "Watercolour" at the 2011 MTV Europe Music Awards at Belfast City Hall in Belfast, Northern Ireland, United Kingdom during the backstage show on 6 November 2011.

Track listings

iTunes digital bundle
"Watercolour" – 5:04
"Watercolour"  – 3:28
"Watercolour"  – 6:06
"Watercolour"  – 5:07
"Watercolour"  – 3:29

Digital single
"Watercolour" – 5:04

CD single
"Watercolour" – 5:04
"Watercolour"  – 3:28
"Watercolour"  – 6:06
"Watercolour"  – 5:07

12-inch vinyl single
A. "Watercolour" – 5:04
B. "Watercolour"  – 4:35

12-inch remixes vinyl single A. "Watercolour"  – 6:06
B. "Watercolour"  – 5:07

PersonnelPendulum Rob Swire – writer, producer, vocals, synthesisers, mixing
 Gareth McGrillen – production assistant
 KJ Sawka – acoustic drumsOther contributors'''
 Andy Greenwood – trumpet
 Craig Wild – trumpet
 Andy Wood – trombone
 Adrian Revell – brass
 Martin Williams – brass
 Emalkay – remix
 deadmau5 – remix

Chart performance
As predicted by midweek sales estimates, "Watercolour" debuted on the UK Singles Chart on 9 May 2010 at number four, marking Pendulum's most successful single after "Propane Nightmares" reached number nine in 2008. In its second week in the chart, the single fell to number 13. On 26 May 2010, the single fell to number 22, before climbing three places to number 19 following the release of the album.

"Watercolour" also debuted on the Australian Singles Chart on 10 May 2010 at number 37. The following week, the single fell 10 places to number 47. The single also debuted the same day on the New Zealand Top 40 chart at number 37. However, the single dropped out of the top 40 the following week. "Watercolour" was listed on Triple J's Hottest 100, 2010 countdown and came in at number 69.

Weekly charts

Year-end charts

Certifications

Release history

References

2010 singles
Songs written by Rob Swire
2010 songs
Warner Music Group singles
Pendulum (drum and bass band) songs